The outer plexiform layer (external plexiform layer) is a layer of neuronal synapses in the retina of the eye. It consists of a dense network of synapses between dendrites of horizontal cells from the inner nuclear layer, and photoreceptor cell inner segments from the outer nuclear layer. It is much thinner than the inner plexiform layer, where amacrine cells synapse with retinal ganglion cells.

The synapses in the outer plexiform layer are between the rod cell endings or cone cell branched foot plates and horizontal cells. Unlike in most systems, rod and cone cells release neurotransmitters when not receiving a light signal.

References

External links
 

Human eye anatomy

ca:Retina#Capes de la retina